Cape Hickey is a cape on the coast of Victoria Land, Antarctica, just east of Charcot Cove and Marin Glacier. It forms the outer, north portal of the re-entrant through which Mawson Glacier flows to the Ross Sea. The cape was mapped by the United States Geological Survey from ground surveys and U.S. Navy air photos, and was named by the Advisory Committee on Antarctic Names in 1964 for Lieutenant John Hickey, U.S. Navy, a pilot with Navy Squadron VX-6, who participated in the Topo North and South surveys in 1962.

References

Headlands of Victoria Land
Scott Coast